The Hickinbottom Award (also referred to as the Hickinbottom Fellowship) is awarded annually by the Royal Society of Chemistry for contributions in the area of organic chemistry from researchers under the age of 35. The prize winner receives a monetary award and will complete a lecture tour within the UK. The winner is chosen by the awards committee of the Royal Society of Chemistry's organic division.

Award history

The award was established by the Royal Society of Chemistry in 1979 following Wilfred Hickinbottom's bequest. Hickinbottom was noted for supporting high standards in experimental chemistry. 

Part of the monetary award is the Briggs scholarship, which was funded following a bequest from Lady Alice Lilian Thorpe, William Briggs' daughter.

Previous recipients

The award was first granted in 1981 to Steven Ley and Jeremy Sanders.

Subsequent recipients include:

See also

 List of chemistry awards

References

Awards of the Royal Society of Chemistry
Awards established in 1979